Blagoja Todorovski (born 11 June 1985 in Skopje) nicknamed Blaže is a football midfielder from the Republic of Macedonia who currently plays for North Macedonian side Skopje.

International career
Todorovski played four games for Macedonia, he made his debut on 18 June 2014 in friendly match against China which ended with a 2–0 loss. Four days later he played again against China, this time the score was 0–0. He also played in a Euro 2016 qualification match against Belarus which ended with a 2–1 loss. His final international was a March 2015 friendly against Australia, which ended 0–0.

Honours
Renova
Macedonian First League: 2009–10
Rabotnički
Macedonian First League: 2013–14
Macedonian Football Cup: 2013–14, 2014–15
Shkendija
Macedonian First League: 2017–18, 2018–19
Macedonian Football Cup: 2015–16, 2017–18
Teuta Durrës
Albanian Cup: 2019–20
Albanian Supercup: 2020
Albanian Superliga: 2020–21
Albanian Supercup: 2021

References

External links

1985 births
Living people
Footballers from Skopje
Association football midfielders
Macedonian footballers
North Macedonia international footballers
FK Kumanovo players
FK Sileks players
FC Dinamo București players
FK Renova players
FK Rabotnički players
KF Shkëndija players
KF Teuta Durrës players
Macedonian First Football League players
Liga I players
Liga II players
Kategoria Superiore players
Macedonian expatriate footballers
Expatriate footballers in Romania
Macedonian expatriate sportspeople in Romania
Expatriate footballers in Albania
Macedonian expatriate sportspeople in Albania
FC Dinamo București II players